Count Gyula Andrássy de Csíkszentkirály et Krasznahorka the Younger (30 June 1860 – 11 June 1929) was a Hungarian politician.

Biography
The second son of Count Gyula Andrássy and Countess Katinka Kendeffy, the younger Andrássy became under-secretary in the Sándor Wekerle ministry in 1892; in 1893, he became Minister of Education, and, in June 1894, he was appointed minister in attendance on the king, retiring in 1895 with Wekerle. In 1898, with his elder brother, he left the Liberal Party but returned to it after the fall of the Bánffy ministry. In 1905, he was one of the leaders of the Coalition which brought about the fall of the Liberal Tisza ministry. In 1906 he became Minister of the Interior in the compromise Wekerle cabinet and held that office until the fall of the ministry in 1909.

In 1912, he represented Austria-Hungary in the diplomatic endeavor to prevent the outbreak of the Balkan War. In 1915, he urged peacemaking and an extension of the franchise in Hungary. As Foreign Minister of Austria-Hungary, in 1918, he declared the alliance with Germany dissolved and tried to conclude a separate peace. He retired from office in the same year was returned in 1920 to the National Assembly as non-partisan delegate. He subsequently became leader of the Christian National Party. He is the author of Ungarns Ausgleich mit Österreich vom Jahre 1867 (Ger. ed., Leipzig, 1897) and a work in Hungarian on the origins of the Hungarian state and constitution (Budapest, 1901). That book was translated into English and published as The Development of Hungarian Constitutional Liberty (London, 1908) His later works include Wer hat den Krieg verbrochen? Interessensolidarität des Deutschtums and Ungartums (translated by Ernest J. Euphrat and published in 1915 as "Whose Sin is the World-War?") and Diplomatie und Weltkrieg.

References

External links
 Count József Andrássy Gyula Foundation
 Austrian Lexikon aeiou 
 

1860 births
1929 deaths
People from Trebišov
Gyula
Foreign ministers of Austria-Hungary
Hungarian writers
Hungarian monarchists
Hungarian Interior Ministers
Foreign ministers of Hungary
Members of the Hungarian Academy of Sciences
Children of national leaders
Children of prime ministers of Hungary
Knights of the Golden Fleece of Austria